Fireball ( pronounced "Tar Chon") is a 2009 Thai martial arts  action film. The film  directed by Thanakorn Pongsuwan combines Muay Thai and basketball.

Plot
Tai, a young man arrested on a crime charge, is discharged thanks to his twin brother Tan's dogged help. After being set free, he finds Tan in a coma with severe injuries. Tan's girlfriend, Pang, tells Tai that his brother got involved in some risky business to raise money to fight Tai's case. Tai feels guilty that his problems brought his brother trouble. He then traces what happened to Tan, which ultimately leads him into illegal basketball gambling. Tai wants to find out who is behind this gambling and why his brother was beaten unconscious. He finally joins the "Fireball" team, a team which belongs to Hia Den and whose players include Singha, Kay, Ik, and Muek. In order to uncover the truth, Tai trades many things-possibly even his life.

Cast

Preeti Barameeanat as Tai - Tan
Khanutra Chuchuaysuwan	 as Pang
Kumpanat Oungsoongnern	 as Muk
Phutharit Prombandal as Den
9 Million Sam	 as Zing
Rattanaballang Tohssawat as Tun (credited as Arucha Tosawat)
 Kannut Samerjai-Yi

Reception
The film's director won the Guru Prize for Most Energetic Film at the Fant-Asia Film Festival, and was tied with Vampire Girl vs. Frankenstein Girl. The  film received a mixed reception from film critics.

References

External links
 

2009 films
Thai Muay Thai films
Thai-language films
Thai martial arts films
Muay Thai films
Basketball films
2009 action films